Coleophora pseudorepentis is a moth of the family Coleophoridae. It is found in France, Germany, Austria, Italy, Croatia, Hungary, Slovakia, Ukraine, Sardinia and Corsica.

The larvae feed on Achillea odorata and Achillea ligustica. They feed on the generative organs of their host plant.

References

pseudorepentis
Moths of Europe
Moths described in 1960